The Visitation  (Hungarian: Vizitáció) is a 1506 panel painting by Hungarian painter known as Master MS in the collection of the Hungarian National Gallery in Budapest.

Analysis
This medieval Hungarian painting shows the Visitation of St. Elisabeth and Virgin Mary. All the natural elements that are depicted are in praise of the Lord. This idyll, however, is just an illusion - the bare rocks, twisted trees, beautiful and delicate flowers - iris, peony, strawberries in the foreground, are subtle symbols of the passion. Elizabeth makes homage to the Virgin Mary to show her devotion by slightly raising her left hand to kiss her. The painting once hung in the Church of Saint Catherine in Selmecbánya (today Banská Štiavnica, Slovakia). Other paintings from the altar of the church are kept in Lille, France, Svätý Anton in Slovakia and the Keresztény Múzeum in Esztergom, Hungary. The inscription has been identified as being the same as that on an altar dedicated to the Virgin Mary in Krakow. It is believed that MS was Marten Swarcz.

Others from the Church of St. Catherine

References 

Paintings in the collection of the Hungarian National Gallery
Paintings of the Visitation
1506 paintings